Onwaard is a former municipality in the Dutch province of South Holland. It was located east of the village of Melissant on the island Goeree-Overflakkee. The municipality contained no villages nor hamlets; only a few farms. It consisted of a number of small polders: Onwaard, Oud-Kraaijer, Kraaijenisse, and part of the Nieuw-Kraaijer polder.

The municipality existed between 1817 and 1857, when it merged with Melissant. It had 170 inhabitants in the middle of the 19th century.

References

Former municipalities of South Holland
Goeree-Overflakkee